Laskey is a surname. Notable people with the surname include:

Alice M. Laskey (1906–1998), U.S. naval officer and biochemist
Bill Laskey (born 1957), American former professional baseball player
Bill Laskey (American football) (1943–2022), American former football linebacker
Charles Laskey (1908–1998), American ballet dancer, musical theatre performer
Sir Denis Laskey (1916–1987), British ambassador
Michael Laskey (born 1944), English poet and editor
Jack Laskey (born 1982), English actor, son of Michael Laskey
John Laskey Woolcock (1862–1929), barrister and Supreme Court judge in Queensland, Australia
Kathleen Laskey, Canadian actress, primarily associated with television roles
Posteal Laskey, believed to be the Cincinnati Strangler, a serial killer between 1965 and 1966
Ron Laskey (born 1945), British cell biologist and cancer researcher

See also
Laskey, Jaggard and Brown v United Kingdom, case argued before the European Court of Human Rights
Lasky, surname
Lackey (surname)
Laissey